John Gower (January 10, 1941 – December 10, 2011) was an American Republican politician.

Born in Kankakee, Illinois, Gower received his bachelor and law degrees from Marquette University. Gower served as district attorney of Brown and Shawano Counties and on the Board of Supervisors of the two counties. He served in the Wisconsin State Assembly 1973–1979 from the 4th District. Gower died in Green Bay, Wisconsin on December 10, 2011. He was 70.

Notes

1941 births
2011 deaths
People from Kankakee, Illinois
Politicians from Green Bay, Wisconsin
People from Shawano County, Wisconsin
Marquette University alumni
Marquette University Law School alumni
County supervisors in Wisconsin
Republican Party members of the Wisconsin State Assembly